The Fort McKay First Nation (FMFN) is a First Nations government in northeast Alberta comprising five Indian reserves – Fort McKay 174, Fort McKay 174C, Fort McKay 174D, Namur Lake 174B and Namur River 174A. The FMFN, signed to Treaty 8, is affiliated with the Athabasca Tribal Council and its members are of Cree, Metis and Dene heritage. The FMFN's traditional lands include portions of the Athabasca oil sands.

History 

The Cree expanded steadily westward from the Hudson-James Bay country. Although the arrival of the Cree in the Lac la Biche region, is unknown, archaeological evidence in the form of pre-contact pottery indicates that the Cree were in this region in the 1500s.

The Historic Voyageur Highway 
The traditional land of the Fort McKay First Nation was on the historical voyageur route that linked the rich Athabaskan region to Hudson Bay. David Thompson and George Simpson used the fur-trade route via the Beaver River from the main Methye Portage route that reached the Athabasca River.

The Cree, one of the "largest tribes in Canada" were referred to by the early explorers and fur traders as Kristineaux, Kinisteneaux, Kiliston, Kree, Cris and various other names such as Nahathaway. Cree territory extended west from the Hudson-James Bay region to the foot of the Rocky Mountains, and in Alberta, between the north banks of the north Saskatchewan River to Fort Chipewyan. This includes the Beaver, Athabaska and Peace River basins. It is noted in the department of Indian Affairs Annual Reports that Pee-ay-sis of the Lac La Biche band as far north as Great Slave Lake."

Alexander Mackenzie who travelled from Montreal to the Arctic Ocean via the Methy Portage (see map) provided a detailed account of the Kinisteneaux (Cree) in 1789.

Tribal Council 
The Athabasca Tribal Council, represents the interests of Fort McKay First Nation, Athabasca Chipewyan First Nation, Chipewyan Prairie First Nation, Fort McMurray No. 468 First Nation and Mikisew Cree First Nation. These five First Nations of North Eastern Alberta include more than 5,000 Cree and Dene people.

Treaty 8 

Treaty 8 was an agreement signed on June 21, 1899, between Queen Victoria and various First Nations of the Lesser Slave Lake area.  The Treaty was signed just south of present-day Grouard, Alberta. The land covered by Treaty 8,  is larger than France and includes northern Alberta, northeastern British Columbia, northwestern Saskatchewan and a southernmost portion of the Northwest Territories. Adhesions to this agreement were signed that same year on July 1 at Peace River Landing, July 6 at Dunvegan, July 8 at Fort Vermilion, July 13 at Fort Chipewyan, July 17 at Smith's Landing, July 25 and 27 at Fond du Lac, August 4 at Fort McMurray, and August 14 at Wabasca Lake. Further Adhesions were in 1900 on May 13 at Fort St. John, June 8 at Lesser Slave Lake, June 23 at Fort Vermilion and July 25 at Fort Resolution.

Traditional land use 
"Hunting and trapping is an integral part of the traditional livelihoods for many Fort McKay residents. Therefore, natural ecosystems and wildlife populations preservation is an important component to help maintain a healthy community." The FMFN expressed concerns about cumulative effects and requested that regulators implement the recommendations in the Terrestrial Ecosystem Management Framework (TEMF) in order to maintain wildlife populations (Cumulative Environmental Management Association 2008). In a letter to the Alberta Environment and Sustainable Resource Development Regulatory Approvals Center regarding the Teck Resources Limited's (Teck) proposed Frontier Oil Sands Mine Project, on FMFN traditional lands, the FMFN stressed that beaver, moose and wood bison are three of the most important species of great importance to the FMFN. Other key resources indicators (KRI) to consider in assessing the effects on wildlife of oil sands development in their territory, include Black Bear, Fisher, Canada Lynx, Northern Goshawk, Yellow Rail, Short‐eared Owl, Common Nighthawk, Olive‐sided Flycatcher, Canada Warbler, Rusty Blackbird, Waterfowl and Western Toad.

Environment 
The "Frontier Mine is a major surface mining project, with a total Project footprint of 24,140 ha and with a 50‐year operational life extending from approximately 2020 to 2070 including final closure and reclamation. Closure activities are proposed to be coordinated with the nearby Shell Pierre River Mine (PRM) project located immediately south."

Groundwater 
FMFN expressed concern about the degradation of the McMurray Basal Water Sands Aquifer (BWS), through high-volume use through the mining process.

Moose Lake 'last wilderness'

Moose Lake is a "sacred region" that serves as the community's "key cultural heartland".  The community originated in the Moose Lake area, which is located 64 km northwest of Fort McKay, and there are gravesites on their traditional lands there, according to a January 20, 2018 article in The Narwhal. Moose Lake is actually two lakes—Gardiner Lake and Namur Lake. Fort McKay is "surrounded on three sides by oilsands development" with mines coming as "close as four kilometres to the community." Moose Lake is the only remaining place that still has clean air and water that is "good enough to drink right from the lake". Grand Chief Mel Grandjamb of the Fort McKay First Nation said that, "We send hunting camps out there every year. We supply cabins to all our elders who want to go out there." The local Métis community also uses Moose Lake for their "traditional activities".

The band began to negotiate with the province of Alberta in the late 1990s to protect the lake and in 2014, then premier Jim Prentice had endorsed plan to protect the lake.  The band had almost come to an agreement with the previous Alberta government in 2018 to create a "10-kilometre buffer".

Brion Energy's Dover oil sands SAGD project (Moose Lake)
The Dover oil sands SAGD project (Moose Lake) project, operated by Brion Energy, is a joint venture between Calgary-based Athabasca Oil Corporation, with Dover holding 40 per cent, and Chinese oil giant PetroChina, which owns 60 per cent."

The FMFN had delayed the Dover project by requiring "a 20-kilometre no-development buffer zone on part of Brion's oil sands leases that were near the FMFN Moose Lake traditional lands. On 6 August 2013, Alberta Energy Regulator’s (AER) denied the FMFN appeal arguing that the Dover oilsands project using steam-assisted gravity drainage technology (SAGD) development would have little impact on FMNN lands. On October 18, 2013 On Friday, Justice Frans Slatter of the Alberta Court of Appeal gave Fort MacKay First Nation leave to appeal the AER's August 6 approval of the Athabasca Oil Corporation's 250,000-barrel-per-day thermal oilsands project, Dover. The Fort MacKay First Nation's lawyer, Karen Buss, predicted that the new panel might "order the regulator to start its process over with direction to consider treaty rights issues identified by the band."

Prosper Petroleum Rigel oil sands SAGD project (Moose Lake)

Prosper Petroleum, which is a junior oil sands company established in 2007 by veterans oilsands operators—BlackRock Ventures and Koch Exploration Canada, had obtained leases from Koch Oil Sands Operating. Prosper Petroleum's Rigel Oil Sands Project is a steam-assisted gravity drainage technology (SAGD) development that is located just three kilometres off the shore of Namur Lake. Prosper Petroleum started drilling evaluation wells near Moose Lake in 2013.

In June 2018, Alberta's energy regulator approved a $440-million, 10,000-barrel-a-day Oil Sands Project. The band launched an appeal of the approval with the Alberta Court of Appeal.

See also 
 The Canadian Crown and Aboriginal peoples

Notes

Citations

References

Further reading

External links 
 Confederacy of Treaty 8 First Nations
 The Making of Treaty 8 - Alberta Online Encyclopedia
 Treaty 8 First Nations of Alberta
 Treaty Texts - Treaty No. 8

Cree governments
Dene governments
First Nations governments in Alberta
History of Alberta
Hudson's Bay Company forts
Indigenous peoples of the Great Plains
Regional Municipality of Wood Buffalo